John Nesbitt (1745 – 15 March 1817) was a British politician and the Member of Parliament for Bodmin from 1796 to 1802.

See also
 List of MPs in the first United Kingdom Parliament

References

1745 births
1817 deaths
British MPs 1780–1784
British MPs 1784–1790
British MPs 1790–1796
British MPs 1796–1800
UK MPs 1801–1802
Members of the Parliament of Great Britain for English constituencies
Members of the Parliament of the United Kingdom for English constituencies